Procne may refer to:
Procne (or Prokne), sister to Philomela, as well as the wife of Tereus, and mother of Itys.
194 Prokne, an asteroid
In the Golden Sun videogame series, one summon is Procne, described as "a goddess in bird form"